Chamberlen is a surname. Notable people with the surname include:

Hugh Chamberlen (c.1632 – after 1720), English physician, son of Peter Chamberlen the third
Hugh Chamberlen the younger (1664–1728), English physician, son of Hugh Chamberlen the elder
Peter Chamberlen the elder (c.1560–1631), French barber-surgeon in England 
Peter Chamberlen the younger (1572–1626), English surgeon, brother of Peter Chamberlen the elder
Peter Chamberlen the third (1601–1683),  English physician, son of Peter Chamberlen the younger

See also
 Chamberlain (surname)
 Chamberlaine
 Chamberlayne (surname)
 Chamberlin (surname)